Kond Rud (also Romanized as Kond Rūd; also known as Kand Roodé Mehranrood, Kondorī, Kondo Rūd, and Kunduri) is a village in Meydan Chay Rural District of the Central District of Tabriz County, East Azerbaijan province, Iran. At the 2006 National Census, its population was 6,758 in 1,744 households. The following census in 2011 counted 8,725 people in 2,561 households. The latest census in 2016 showed a population of 8,518 people in 2,671 households; it was the largest village in its rural district.

References 

Tabriz County

Populated places in East Azerbaijan Province

Populated places in Tabriz County